Located in Los Angeles, Occidental College competes in the Southern California Intercollegiate Athletic Conference (SCIAC) at the NCAA's Division III level. Approximately 25 percent of all students play a varsity sport, and nearly half of all students participate in all athletics activities combined (including a host of club sports and intramural leagues).

History
In 1889–90 Professor James Parkhill (Occidental College’s fourth president, from 1896–97) organized intramural games for interested College men and Academy boys. His enthusiastic leadership laid the groundwork for establishing the nickname (Tigers) and school colors (orange and black) after his undergraduate alma mater, Princeton. The school dropped football in 2020.

Rivalries
Every year Occidental played two football games for rivalry trophies. One game was against Pomona-Pitzer and the winner awarded "The Drum." The Drum rivalry is the oldest rivalry game in Southern California, having been contested since 1895. Oxy leads Pomona-Pitzer all time in the series 65–54–3. The other game was against Whittier College and the winner awarded "The Shoes," which are a pair of bronzed cleats from a 1940 graduate from Whittier named Myron Claxton.

Teams
The Tigers have 10 varsity men's teams and 11 varsity women's teams. They also have six club sport teams.

Men's
 Baseball
 Basketball
 Cross Country
 Golf
 Soccer
 Swimming and Diving
 Tennis
 Track and Field
 Water Polo

Women's
 Basketball
 Cross Country
 Golf
 Lacrosse
 Soccer
 Softball
 Swimming and Diving
 Tennis
 Track and Field
 Volleyball
 Water Polo

Club sports
 Dance team
 Men's lacrosse
 Men's and women's rugby
 Men's and women's ultimate frisbee

National championships

Team

Conference championships

Here are a few of the SCIAC titles that Oxy has won:
 Football (2008, 2006, 2005, 2004)
 Men's Cross Country (2006)
 Men's Basketball (2006–07, 2007–08)
 Women's Basketball (2007–08)
 Baseball (2016)
 Track and Field  (1938, 1943, 1948, 1954, 1956-1966, 1968-1977, 1980-1981, 1983-1986, 1988-1990)
 SCIAC All Sports Champions (1984, 1983, 1978)

Men's basketball
For the last decade, under alumnus and winningest coach in school history Brian Newhall, the Tigers have found great success on the court. In that time span the program has compiled a 146–59 (.712) record and have won a pair of SCIAC conference championships (2006–07, 2007–08). Furthermore under Newhall, the Tigers have earned regional and national rankings, produced the only perfect 14–0 record in SCIAC history and triumphed in two NCAA playoff games to reach the NCAA III Elite 8 in 2003. Some Oxy players have pursued professional careers overseas, including four players from Oxy's 25–3 Elite 8 team, have gone overseas. One example is Oxy alumnus Blair Slattery, the all-time career scoring and rebounding leader who signed on with the Munster Basketball Club in Germany in 1993.

The program plays its games in Frank Neill Rush Gymnasium with a seating capacity of 1,800.

References

External links